Squads for the 1956 AFC Asian Cup played in Hong Kong.

Hong Kong

Head coach:  Tom Sneddon

South Vietnam

Head coach: Lê Đức

South Korea

Head coach: Kim Sung-gan

Israel

Head coach:  Jackie Gibbons

References

External links
https://web.archive.org/web/20150524232202/http://rdfc.com.ne.kr/int/skor-intres-1948.html

AFC Asian Cup squads